Skye may refer to:

Surname
 Alexis Skye, (born 1974), an American model
 Azura Skye, Azura Dawn Storozynski (born 1981), American actress
 Ione Skye, Ione Skye Lee (born 1970), British-American actress
 Justine Skye (born 1995), an American singer
 Obert Skye, American children's writer

Given name
 Skye Celine Baker (born 1997), Guamanian beauty pageant titleholder
 Skye Blakely (born 2005), American gymnast
 Skye Blue (born 1999), American professional wrestler
 Skye Bolt (born 1994), American baseball player
 Skye Borgman, American film director and cinematographer
 Skye Chan (born 1983), Hong Kong actress 
 Skye Dawson (born 1990), former American football player
 Skye Lucia Degruttola (born 2005), British actress
 Skye Edwards (born 1974), often known as Skye, English singer 
 Skye Gyngell (born 1963), Australian chef 
 Skye Kakoschke-Moore (born 1985), Australian politician 
 Skye Lourie (born 1990), New Zealand-British actress
 Skye McCole Bartusiak (1992–2014), American actress and model
 Skye McNiel (born 1978), American politician 
 Skye Nicolson (born 1995), Australian boxer
 Skye Patrick, African-American librarian
 Skye Sweetnam (born 1988), Canadian singer
 Skye Townsend (born 1993), African-American actress and singer
 Skye Wallace, Canadian singer-songwriter

Fictional characters
 Skye, a character in PAW Patrol
 Skye, a fictional eagle in Grandia II
 Skye, an alias of Daisy Johnson, a character from Agents of S.H.I.E.L.D.
 Skye, a character from the video game Darkened Skye
 Skye Chandler Quartermaine, is a fictional character from ABC soap operas
 Skye Miller, a character in the novel and Netflix series 13 Reasons Why
 Skye Nakaiye, a character from The Puzzle Place
 Skye Alexandria Tate, a character in Terra Nova
 Ema and Lana Skye, Ace Attorney characters
 Deirdre Skye, faction leader in Sid Meier's Alpha Centauri
 Skye, a champion in Paladins
 Skye, a character in the battle royale game Fortnite, introduced in Chapter 2 Season 2.
 Skye Masterson, a character from the musical Guys and Dolls

See also
Skye (disambiguation)